Kenneth Bernard Brown (born March 10, 1965) is a former American football wide receiver who played one season with the Cincinnati Bengals of the National Football League. He played college football at Southern Arkansas University and attended Pine Bluff High School in Pine Bluff, Arkansas.

References

External links
Just Sports Stats

Living people
1965 births
Players of American football from Louisiana
American football wide receivers
Southern Arkansas Muleriders football players
Cincinnati Bengals players
Sportspeople from Monroe, Louisiana
National Football League replacement players